Lot and His Daughters may refer to one of a number of paintings by Orazio Gentileschi:
Lot and His Daughters (Orazio Gentileschi, Bilbao)
Lot and His Daughters (Orazio Gentileschi, Berlin)
Lot and His Daughters (Orazio Gentileschi, Los Angeles)
Lot and His Daughters (Orazio Gentileschi, Madrid)
Lot and His Daughters (Orazio Gentileschi, Ottawa)